Pregnana Milanese is a town located in the Metropolitan City of Milan, Lombardy, northern Italy.

It is served by Pregnana Milanese railway station.

References

Cities and towns in Lombardy